Bluemercury is a chain of American beauty stores founded in 1999 by Marla Malcolm Beck and Barry Beck in Georgetown, Washington, D.C. The stores sell cosmetics, as well as in-store facials and spa treatments. In addition to selling products from other brands, the company developed its own M-61 skincare line in 2012 and Lune+Aster make-up line in 2015.

The company was acquired in 2015 by Macy's, which opened in-store Bluemercury shops in its department stores, as well as expanding the number of free-standing stores.

History
Bluemercury was founded in 1999 as an online shopping website for luxury cosmetics.  The co-founders Marla Malcolm (later Marla Malcolm Beck) became CEO and Barry Beck became COO. However, luxury brands that Bluemercury courted were unsure whether they wanted to sell their goods on the internet, while consumers were not accustomed to buying cosmetics without trying them first.

The couple found two struggling independent beauty boutiques in Georgetown and Dupont Circle called EFX, which they used to help fill their online orders. They bought  and rebranded the stores "Bluemercury," converting them to their developing concept, a neighborhood store offering beauty products, personalized advice and samples.

By 2006, Bluemercury was generating $17 million in annual revenue and operated 12 stores. In June 2006, the Becks sold a stake in the company to the private-equity firm Invus Group.

In July 2021, Maly Bernstein was announced as new CEO effective September 2021.

Macy's acquisition
The Becks sold the company to Macy's Inc. for $210 million in 2015, while retaining their positions as CEO and COO.  Macy's added Bluemercury stores, called "shop-in-shops", inside some of its own department stores; the first, three in California and one in Houston, were launched in 2016. As of October 29, 2022, there are 20 Macy's locations that feature a Bluemercury store-within-store.

Retail stores
Bluemercury stores are designed to be small, drugstore-like shops near residential and business areas. Each store location has a spa and provides other services. The stores'  collection of brands includes SkinCeuticals, Nars, Bobbi Brown, and Laura Mercier, among others.

In 2016, the company opened its 100th store, in Savannah, Georgia. At 2,400 square feet, it was their first entry into a larger store-size retail format. In 2017, the company opened a 2,700 square-foot flagship store in Manhattan, its 145th store.

Products
Bluemercury opened its own cosmetics design laboratory, M-61 Laboratories, in 2006. In 2015, the company launched Lune+Aster. The company's cosmetics are not tested on animals; are paraben-free and phthalate-free; and most are vitamin-infused, vegan, and gluten-free.

References

External links

Macy's, Inc.
Retail companies of the United States
American companies established in 1999
Retail companies established in 1999
2015 mergers and acquisitions
Beauty stores
1999 establishments in Washington, D.C.
Beauty salons